Mandel's (a.k.a. Mandel's Shoe Stores and Mandel's Fascinating Slippers) was a chain of shoe stores in the Southwestern United States for many decades of the 20th century. For a time it advertised its wares as "Mandel's Fascinating Slippers". Maurice Mandel headed up the stores through the 1930s, 1940s and 1950s. Later Mandel would later serve as General Merchandise Manager (GMM) of chain Mullen & Bluett and president of Harris & Frank.
Among its branches were:

in Central Los Angeles:
Downtown Los Angeles, flagship store at 518 W. 7th St., opened March 1936, claimed to be the largest shoe store in the Western United States
Beverly Hills, 9670 Wilshire Boulevard, opened 1954
Hollywood - 2 Hollywood Boulevard locations
Miracle Mile - 5480 Wilshire Boulevard, closed in 1970s. One of the earliest commercial structures in the Miracle Mile, built in 1927–9 in Spanish Colonial Revival style and remodeled in 1949 by Eugene Burke and Charles M. Kober in "ultra-modern California style featuring soft color contrasts".

in the rest of Greater Los Angeles:
Glendale - 327 N. Brand Ave., opened 1953
Lakewood Center, Lakewood, remodeled 1962
Long Beach - 3rd and Pine
 Pasadena - 246 S. Lake St., opened 1957, cost $160,000, at that time the 10th store in the chain
Santa Ana 406 N. Main St.

Elsewhere:
El Paso, Texas - 208 N. Mesa
Phoenix

In 1957, a California Appellate Court rules that Mandel's could not refuse to sell merchandise to Africa Americans, as a retail store was a "place of public accommodation", overruling a previous decision that stores were not covered by state anti-Jim Crow laws.

References

Shoe companies of the United States
Footwear retailers of the United States